Thomas Michael Caldwell (November 9, 1949 – April 28, 1980) was the bassist for The Marshall Tucker Band between 1973 and 1980.

Caldwell composed several of their songs and played bass, percussion, guitar, as well as contributing backup vocals, though he sang lead on "Melody Ann" the only song on which he performed lead vocals. His last performance with the band was on April 18, 1980, ten days before his fatal accident. The performance is captured on the 2006 release, Live on Long Island. Caldwell was known for playing a white 1970s Fender Precision Bass with a Dimarzio Split Coil Pickup. A mix of finger style and picked bass as well as his use of tube amplifiers contributed to Caldwell's signature sound.

A native of Spartanburg, South Carolina, he died at the age of 30 from injuries suffered when his Land Cruiser clipped a parked 1965 Ford Galaxie on April 28, 1980.

The Charlie Daniels Band's 1980 album Full Moon is dedicated to Caldwell.

Personal life
He was the younger brother of bandmate and band co-founder, Toy Caldwell. 

Another brother, Tim Caldwell, also died in a traffic accident one month before Tommy, on March 28, 1980, at age 25.

References

External links

1949 births
1980 deaths
American rock bass guitarists
American male bass guitarists
American Southern Rock musicians
Road incident deaths in South Carolina
20th-century American bass guitarists
The Marshall Tucker Band members
20th-century American male musicians